This is the complete list of Asian Games medalists in sepak takraw from 1990 to 2018.

Men

Circle

Doubles

Regu

Quadrant

Team doubles

Team regu

Women

Circle

Doubles

Regu

Quadrant

Team regu

References 

Medalists from previous Asian Games – Sepaktakraw

External links 
 Asian Sepak Takraw Federation

Sepak takraw
medalists